The 1843 Vermont gubernatorial election was held on September 5, 1843.

Incumbent Whig Governor Charles Paine did not run for re-election.

Whig nominee John Mattocks defeated Democratic nominee Daniel Kellogg and Liberty nominee Charles K. Williams.

Since no candidate received a majority in the popular vote, Mattocks was elected by the Vermont General Assembly per the state constitution.

General election

Candidates
Daniel Kellogg, Democratic, former United States Attorney for the District of Vermont
John Mattocks, Whig, former U.S. Representative
Charles K. Williams, Liberty, incumbent Chief Judge of the Vermont Supreme Court, Liberty nominee for Governor in 1842

Results

Legislative election
As no candidate received a majority of the vote, the Vermont General Assembly was required to decide the election, both Houses meeting jointly choosing among the top three vote-getters, Mattocks, Kellogg, and Williams. The legislative election was held on October 12, 1843.

References

1843
Vermont
Gubernatorial